Kota Tinggi is a town and capital of Kota Tinggi District, Johor, Malaysia. Kota Tinggi is also the name of the district, Kota Tinggi District, where the town is situated. Kota Tinggi is the largest district in Johor.

Kuala Sedili or Tanjung Sedili, a small fishing town located 37 km north-east of Kota Tinggi town, is the second largest fishing port in east coast of Peninsular Malaysia.

History

Kota Tinggi was hardest hit in the flood that devastated Johor and some parts of Pahang, Melaka, and Negeri Sembilan. Nearly 100,000 people had to be evacuated to rescue centres.

The first flood wave started on 19 December 2006 and sunk almost the whole town of Kota Tinggi. The second wave, which began on 11 January 2007, at  exceeded even the height of the first wave. Kota Tinggi town was totally underwater for nearly two weeks and was isolated from other towns due to landslides and flooding.

Geography

The town spans over an area of 17 km2.

Administration 
Kota Tinggi town and other settlement of Kuala Sedili, Sungai Rengit and Pengerang are administered by Kota Tinggi District Council (Majlis Daerah Kota Tinggi), which is based in Kota Tinggi town.

The higher administrator of this town called Pegawai Daerah (district officer), which is normally changed every 5–6 years as being promoted by the city council. His official home can be seen nearby the field of the city called Padang Kerajaan Kota Tinggi, near the highest building in Kota Tinggi, The Bangunan Sultan Iskandar. The building houses the district council offices.

Politics
Kota Tinggi is represented in the Dewan Rakyat of the Malaysian Parliament by Dato' Noor Ehsanuddin Mohd Harun Narrashid from UMNO, part of the federal ruling alliance Barisan Nasional.

On the state level, Kota Tinggi constituency contributes two seats to the Johor State Legislative Assembly:
 Sedili; and
 Johor Lama,

in which both seats were also represented by UMNO.'

Tourist attractions

Kota Tinggi is known as a historical town because the Sultanate of Johor was established there. Many historical tombs are found here including the Sultan Mahmud Mangkat Di Julang Mausoleum, Makam Bendahara Tun Habib Abdul Majid and Makam Tauhid in Kampung Makam. Makam Laksamana Bentan is located in Kampung Kelantan.

The waterfalls are 36 meters high, and are located at the base of the 634 meter high Gunung Muntahak mountain. The river water drains through a series of shallow pools used for swimming. The natural environment of some parts of the location has somewhat been spoiled by resort development with artificial landscaping.

There are also many beaches along the coastal part of Kota Tinggi. The most popular beaches are Tanjung Balau, Desaru and Batu Layar ('sail rock'), which are 58 km, 55 km, and 62 km from Kota Tinggi town respectively. Chalets and hotels offering reasonable rates can easily be found along the beach.

Teluk Sengat, located 25 km east of Kota Tinggi town, is a village visited by tourists for its seafood.

Museums in Kota Tinggi is Kota Tinggi Museum.

Transportation

Road
The town is accessible by bus from Johor Bahru Sentral (6B, 41, 227), Larkin Sentral (66, 227). or by Causeway Link route 6B.

Federal Route 3, Federal Route 91 and Federal Route 92 intersect at Kota Tinggi. Federal Route 3 is the main highway linking Johor Bahru to the east coast cities of Kuantan (Pahang), Kuala Terengganu (Terengganu) and Kota Bharu (Kelantan). Federal Route 91 connects Kota Tinggi to the railway town of Kluang while Federal Route 92 joins Kota Tinggi to Pengerang. Federal Route 94 also connects Kota Tinggi to Kulai. North–South Expressway Southern Route has an interchange in Kulai to connects Kota Tinggi from Kuala Lumpur.

References

External links 

 Kota Tinggi WIFI List
 Official website of the Kota Tinggi District Council

Kota Tinggi District
Towns in Johor